Uzunbabalı (also, Usun-Babaly and Uzunbabaly) is a village in the Neftchala Rayon of Azerbaijan. The village forms part of the municipality of Mirzəqurbanlı.

References 

Populated places in Neftchala District